Kanmer, locally known as Bakar Kot, is an archaeological site belonging to Indus Valley civilization, located in Rapar Taluk, Kutch District, Gujarat, India.

Excavation
Indo-Japanese joint excavation at Kanmer was undertaken during 2006 by Institute of Rajasthan Studies, RIHN, JRN Rajasthan Vidyapeeth, Archeology Department, Gujarat and Japanese team.

Architecture
The site was strongly fortified despite being small, perhaps because it may have been located on trade route between Sindh and Saurashtra.

Findings
Rich ceramic assemblage, representing the Mature Harappan culture was found at this site. Three clay seals with central holes, making them pendants, with Indus scripts were found. A large number of bead-making goods — 150 stone beads and roughouts, 160 drill bits, 433 faience beads and 20,000 steatite beads — were found here, indicating the site's importance as an industrial unit.

Importance
The figures appearing on clay seals and their similarity with those of Mohenjo-daro indicate Kanmer's association with bigger trade centres like Harappa and Mohenjo-daro.

References

Further reading
KHARAKWAL, J.S., Y.S. RAWAT & T. OSADA.(2008) Preliminary observations on the excavation at Kanmer, Kachchh, India, in T. Osada & A. Uesugi (ed.) Linguistics, Archaeology and the Human past (Research Institute for Humanity and Nature, Occasional Paper 5): 5-24. Kyoto: Research Institute for Humanity and Nature.

Archaeology of India
History of India
Geography of Gujarat
Indus Valley civilisation sites